Małgorzata Stasiak (born 5 November 1988) is a Polish handball player. She plays for the club SPR Pogoń Szczecin the Polish national team and represented Poland at the 2013 World Women's Handball Championship in Serbia.

References

External links
Player profile at the Polish Handball Association website 

Polish female handball players
1988 births
Living people
People from Skwierzyna
21st-century Polish women